The Complete Collection may refer to:

 The Complete Collection (Boney M. album), 2000
 The Complete Collection (Lisa Stansfield album), 2003
 The Complete Collection, a 2021 EP by Bella Taylor Smith

See also
The Complete Collection and Then Some..., a greatest hits compilation by Barry Manilow